The Nordic Junior Race Walking Championships was an annual international racewalking competition between under-20 athletes from the Nordic countries organised by Nordic Athletics. Established in 1966 as a one-day event between Denmark, Finland, Iceland, Norway and Sweden, it became a contest between Finland, Norway and Sweden only in 1999, then had its final edition in 2003, after which point the junior racewalking events were hosted within the main Nordic Race Walking Championships.

Editions

References

Editions
Competition Venues. Nordic Athletics. Retrieved 2020-02-16.

Nordic Athletics competitions
Recurring sporting events established in 1966
Recurring sporting events disestablished in 2003
Under-20 athletics competitions
Racewalking competitions
Defunct athletics competitions